Carl John Barisich (born July 12, 1951) is a former American football defensive tackle in the National Football League for the Cleveland Browns, Seattle Seahawks, Miami Dolphins, and the New York Giants.

Early life
Barisich played high school football at Bergen Catholic High School in Oradell, New Jersey.  He then played college football at Princeton University and was drafted in the eleventh round of the 1973 NFL Draft with the 281st overall pick.

References

Living people
1951 births
American football defensive linemen
Bergen Catholic High School alumni
Cleveland Browns players
Seattle Seahawks players
Miami Dolphins players
New York Giants players
Princeton Tigers football players
Players of American football from Jersey City, New Jersey